Bratz: Forever Diamondz may refer to:

 Bratz: Forever Diamondz (film)
 Bratz: Forever Diamondz Soundtrack
 Bratz: Forever Diamondz (video game)